Contortylenchus is a genus of nematodes belonging to the family Allantonematidae.

The species of this genus are found in Japan and Australia.

Species:

Contortylenchus acuminati 
Contortylenchus amitini 
Contortylenchus cribicolli 
Contortylenchus cryphali 
Contortylenchus cunicularii 
Contortylenchus laricis 
Contortylenchus proximus

References

Nematodes